João d’Avila Moreira Lima (August 30, 1919 – September 30, 2011) was a Brazilian bishop of the Roman Catholic Church.

Biography
Lima was born in Itabirito, Brazil and ordained a priest on April 8, 1944. He was appointed an auxiliary bishop of the Archdiocese of São Sebastião do Rio de Janeiro as well as Titular Bishop on June 21, 1982 and ordained bishop on August 24, 1982. Lima retired as auxiliary bishop from the Archdiocese of São Sebastião do Rio de Janeiro on March 20, 2002.

See also

References

External links
Catholic Hierarchy
Archdiocese Site (Portuguese)

1919 births
2011 deaths
20th-century Roman Catholic bishops in Brazil
Roman Catholic bishops of São Sebastião do Rio de Janeiro